Kobawaka South Grama Niladhari Division is a Grama Niladhari Division of the Bulathsinhala Divisional Secretariat  of Kalutara District  of Western Province, Sri Lanka .  It has Grama Niladhari Division Code 813B.

Kobawaka South is a surrounded by the Egaloya, Galahena, Ihala Naragala South, Retiyala and Kobawaka North  Grama Niladhari Divisions.

Demographics

Ethnicity 

The Kobawaka South Grama Niladhari Division has a Sinhalese majority (75.6%) and a significant Indian Tamil population (22.4%) . In comparison, the Bulathsinhala Divisional Secretariat (which contains the Kobawaka South Grama Niladhari Division) has a Sinhalese majority (85.0%)

Religion 

The Kobawaka South Grama Niladhari Division has a Buddhist majority (75.7%) and a significant Hindu population (18.7%) . In comparison, the Bulathsinhala Divisional Secretariat (which contains the Kobawaka South Grama Niladhari Division) has a Buddhist majority (84.8%) and a significant Hindu population (10.2%)

Grama Niladhari Divisions of Bulathsinhala Divisional Secretariat

References